Robert Cunningham Bruce (1843 – 23 April 1917) was a Scottish-born sailor, New Zealand politician and conservationist.

Born in East Lothian, Scotland, Bruce's family moved to County Cork, Ireland, when he was seven years of age. He became an apprentice sailor at 13, leaving London on an East Indiaman. He eventually arrived in New Zealand on the Blue Jacket in 1860.

After working in the goldfields of New Zealand and Queensland, he went to the United States where he remained for several years. In 1877 he returned to New Zealand, buying land in Paraekaretu in the Manawatu region.

Bruce was an independent conservative Member of Parliament in the Manawatu region of New Zealand. He stood in the 1891 Egmont by-election but was beaten by Felix McGuire.

The Rangitiki electorate, meanwhile, had been won by Douglas Hastings Macarthur in 1890, but Macarthur died on 24 May 1892. The resulting  was won by Bruce. He served until the end of the parliamentary term in 1893 when he retired. He challenged Stevens again in the  but was again defeated.

Bruce was a notable pioneer of the Manawatu District, who preserved several native forest remnants, including Bruce Park Scenic Reserve. Late in his life, he wrote a book about his experiences at sea. He died at his homestead Carrick in the Wanganui suburb of St. Johns Hill on 23 April 1917.

Bibliography

Notes

References

1843 births
1917 deaths
New Zealand MPs for North Island electorates
People from East Lothian
Scottish emigrants to New Zealand
New Zealand conservationists
Members of the New Zealand House of Representatives
Unsuccessful candidates in the 1890 New Zealand general election
Unsuccessful candidates in the 1896 New Zealand general election
Unsuccessful candidates in the 1899 New Zealand general election
19th-century New Zealand politicians